Artur Sobiech (born 12 June 1990) is a Polish professional footballer who plays as a forward for Lech Poznań.

Club career
Sobiech was born in Ruda Śląska. After spending four years at Ruch Chorzów, where he started his professional career, Sobiech joined Polonia Warsaw in July 2010. Polonia paid €1 million for him. He was named Ekstraklasa discovery of the year.

On 30 June 2011, Sobiech transferred to Bundesliga side Hannover 96, signing a contract until June 2014. In May 2013, the club announced that he had extended his contract until 30 June 2017.

On 9 August 2018, Sobiech joined Lechia Gdańsk on a three-year contract. In his first season at Lechia Sobiech found himself to be the second choice forward behind Flávio Paixão. His season started well, scoring a hat-trick against Zagłębie Lubin, but then only managed to score another four league goals in his next 23 games. Sobiech fared better in the Polish Cup that season, scoring three goals in four games, including scoring the only goal in the 2019 Polish Cup final against Jagiellonia Białystok to secure the cup win for Lechia. Despite statistically not having the best season, Sobiech played an important role in Lechia securing their joint highest league finish in their history of third, and leading the club to cup success. The following season started well for both Sobiech and Lechia, with Sobiech coming on as a substitute as Lechia won the Polish SuperCup. 

After a promising start for Lechia in the 2019–20 season, Sobiech left the club during the winter break for Fatih Karagümrük. In total Sobiech made 52 appearances and scored 16 goals in the club's most successful period in their modern history.

On 29 June 2021, Sobiech made his return to Polish football by signing a two-year contract with Lech Poznań.

International career
After playing for the Poland U-21 team, Sobiech received his first call-up to the Poland national team in May 2010. He debuted on 29 May against Finland, replacing Ireneusz Jeleń in the 89th minute. The match ended in a goalless 0–0 result. He scored his first goal on 22 May 2012 in a 1–0 friendly win against Latvia. He represented the national team at UEFA Euro 2012.

Personal life
He married Polish handball player Bogna Sobiech in 2011.

Career statistics

Club

International

Scores and results list Poland's goal tally first, score column indicates score after each Sobiech goal.

Honours
Lechia Gdańsk
Polish Cup: 2018–19
Polish Super Cup: 2019

Lech Poznań
Ekstraklasa: 2021–22

References

External links
 
 

Living people
1990 births
Sportspeople from Ruda Śląska
Polish footballers
Association football wingers
Association football forwards
Poland international footballers
Poland youth international footballers
Poland under-21 international footballers
UEFA Euro 2012 players
Ekstraklasa players
II liga players
Bundesliga players
2. Bundesliga players
Süper Lig players
TFF First League players
Ruch Chorzów players
Polonia Warsaw players
Hannover 96 players
SV Darmstadt 98 players
Lechia Gdańsk players
Fatih Karagümrük S.K. footballers
Lech Poznań players
Lech Poznań II players
Polish expatriate footballers
Expatriate footballers in Germany
Expatriate footballers in Turkey
Polish expatriate sportspeople in Germany
Polish expatriate sportspeople in Turkey